Wåhlander is a surname. Notable people with the surname include:

 Kristofer Wåhlander (born 1974), Swedish conductor
  (1936–1992), Swedish stage and television actress
 Torgny Wåhlander (born 1935), Swedish long jumper